This article contains information about the literary events and publications of 1655.

Events
February 24 – The English playwright Thomas Porter abducts his future bride Anne Blount.
March 26 – The playwright Thomas Porter kills a soldier named Thomas Salkeld in Covent Garden, probably in a duel, is consequently tried for murder, pleads guilty to manslaughter, is allowed benefit of clergy, and is sentenced to be burned in the hand.
May–October – Church of England clergyman Jeremy Taylor is imprisoned at Chepstow Castle for an injudicious preface to his popular manual of devotion, published this year.
August 6 – The Blackfriars Theatre in London is demolished.
October 29 – To celebrate Lord Mayor's Day, Edmund Gayton's pageant Charity Triumphant or the Virgin Show is staged in London; it is the first City pageant in fifteen years.

New books

Prose
John Bramhall – Defense of True Liberty (Anglican divine begins exchange of treatises with Thomas Hobbes)
Margaret Cavendish, Duchess of Newcastle – The World's Olio
Nicholas Culpeper – Astrological Judgement of Diseases from the Decumbiture of the Sick
Thomas Fuller – The Church History of Britain
John Heydon – Eugenius Theodidacticus
Michel Millot and Jean L'Ange (attributed) – L'Escole des filles
William Prynne
A New Discovery of Free-State Tyranny
The Quakers Unmasked
Thomas Stanley – History of Philosophy
John Wallis –  (attack on the works of Thomas Hobbes)
Izaak Walton – The Compleat Angler (2nd edition)
Baltasar Gracián – El comulgatorio
Francisco de Quevedo – Política de Dios y gobierno de Cristo (second part)
Diego de Saavedra Fajardo – Juicio de artes y ciencias

Drama
Antony Brewer – The Lovesick King
Lodowick Carlell – The Passionate Lovers, Parts 1 and 2
Robert Daborne – The Poor Man's Comfort
Robert Davenport – King John and Matilda
Thomas Heywood and William Rowley – Fortune by Land and Sea
Philip Massinger – Three New Plays, a collection that included The Guardian, The Bashful Lover, and (with John Fletcher) A Very Woman
James Shirley
The Gentleman of Venice
The Politician
Jeremy Taylor –  . .Poetry
Henry Vaughan – Silex Scintillans (part 2)

Births
January 1 – Christian Thomasius, German philosopher (died 1728)
February 7 – Jean-François Regnard, French dramatist and diarist (died 1709)
February 28 – Johann Beer, Austrian author, court official and composer (died 1700)
c. November – Jacob Tonson, English bookseller and publisher (died 1736)unknown date – Lin Yining (林以寧), Chinese poet (died c. 1730)

Deaths
February 25 – Daniel Heinsius, Dutch poet (born 1580)
May 8 – Edward Winslow, English theologian, pamphleteer and New England politician (born 1595)
July 28 – Cyrano de Bergerac, French dramatist (born 1619)
September 7 – François Tristan l'Hermite, French dramatist (born c. 1601)
October 24 – Pierre Gassendi, French philosopher (born 1592)probable'' – John Reynolds, English poet, story-writer and pamphleteer (born c. 1588)

References

 
Years of the 17th century in literature